Granowiec  is a village in the administrative district of Gmina Sośnie, within Ostrów Wielkopolski County, Greater Poland Voivodeship, in west-central Poland.

The village has an approximate population of 1,360. Famous people that lived here: Feliks Krawiec, Bernard Zakrzewski, Łukasz Królik.

References

Granowiec